Jason Gray may refer to:

 Jason Gray (musician) (born 1972), American contemporary Christian singer-songwriter
 Jason Gray (poet), American poet
 Jason Gray, cast member on the American sketch comedy television show Studio C

See also
Jason Gray-Stanford (born 1970), Canadian film, television actor and voice actor